Ashok Kantha or Ashok K. Kantha is an Indian diplomat and was formerly the Indian Ambassador to the China. He is a 1977 batch Indian Foreign Service officer. He had previously served as Secretary  to the Ministry of External Affairs Government of India (2013–2014), High Commissioner of India in Sri Lanka (2009–2013) and as India's High Commissioner to Malaysia (2007–2009). He is currently the Director of the Institute of Chinese Studies, Delhi.

Early life and background
Kantha was born on 14 May 1955. After graduating in History from Patna University in 1975, he briefly worked as an executive with the State Bank of India. He joined the Indian Foreign Service in July 1977 and studied Chinese Language at Nanyang University, Singapore.

References

1955 births
Living people
People from Bihar
Patna University alumni
Ambassadors of India to China
Indian Foreign Service officers
High Commissioners of India to Sri Lanka
High Commissioners of India to Malaysia
People of the Sri Lankan Civil War
Indian Peace Keeping Force